Emilio Alzamora Escardibul (born 22 May 1973 in Lleida, Spain) is a former Grand Prix motorcycle road racer. He was the 1999 F.I.M. 125cc world champion. He is the second rider to win a Grand Prix motorcycle world championship without having won a race.

Alzamora got his start racing in the 80cc class, winning the 1989 80cc championship of Catalunya at the age of 16. In 1994, he made his Grand Prix debut in the 125 class as a member of former world champion Paolo Pileri's team. He moved up to the 250 class in 1997, but after a season marred by injuries, he returned to the 125 class. Alzamora won the 1999 125cc world championship without winning a race by virtue of 10 podium positions, defeating Marco Melandri and Masao Azuma who each had five victories. He continued to compete until the 2003 season.

Since 2005 he is the director of the Monlau Competición technical school. He manages motorcycle racing projects from the base up to the Moto3 World Championship with the creation of the new Team Estrella Galicia 0,0.

Career statistics

Grand Prix motorcycle racing
(key) (Races in bold indicate pole position, races in italics indicate fastest lap)

References 

1973 births
Living people
Sportspeople from Lleida
Motorcycle racers from Catalonia
Spanish motorcycle racers
250cc World Championship riders
125cc World Championship riders
125cc World Riders' Champions